is a 1991 platform action game developed by and published by IGS for the Mega Drive exclusively in Japan and South Korea. The player controls the woman warrior-esque title character who struggles against the powers of an evil sorceress raiding her village. The story is told through cut scenes as Dahna is helped along the way by various mythical beasts.

Gameplay
The protagonist Dahna is capable of a few attacks: players can use sword combinations with a repeated press of the Attack button while being able to stab enemies above Dahna and enemies below her as Dahna is jumping. Aside from melee combat, Dahna is also capable of using magic spells. Powered by magic orbs from fallen enemies, Dahna's magic is fueled by a bar that is filled with every orb collected and the spell is determined by how full the bar is. At a small portion of the magic bar Dahna can launch a sideways fire shot while at mid-bar length Dahna can summon a blinding fog. At full bar length, Dahna can summon what is called Thunder Magic, but appears as several downpours of magma. Dahna's life bar can be filled as Dahna progressively collects more life power-ups, allowing her to take more damage.

Throughout the game, Dahna is capable of riding on the backs of different beasts including a horse, a griffin and a large ogre. The first two creatures allow for a different type of stage progression while the griffon and ogre can unleash unique attacks. The game allows a total of five continues per play with no lives system which makes for a high difficulty level throughout its six stages. It also has a high for its time level of violence as every enemy Dahna killed disappeared in a streak of blood and one end stage boss had to be defeated through constant dismemberment.

Plot
There lived a wealthy family whose heirs were two daughters: Regine and Dahna. These two sisters were born with a strange magic that could enable them to summon the elements and other impossible things; it was this magic that many within the spiritual underworld lusted after, particularly Regine whose powers grew stronger with age. On Dahna's seventh birthday, the sisters' parents were murdered in a violent kidnapping attempt, but the wreckage separated the sisters and Dahna escaped. Dahna hid in secrecy, but eventually took shelter in a nearby village where she honed her magic and combat abilities under the guidance of the village sorcerer Magh. Ten years later, a mysterious invasion force led by an evil sorceress attacked her village and kidnapped Magh, prompting Dahna on her first battle.

Reception

References
 Dahna: Megami Tanjou at MobyGames
 Dahna: Megami Tanjou at GameFAQs

1991 video games
Information Global Service games
Fantasy video games
Sega Genesis games
Sega Genesis-only games
Side-scrolling video games
Single-player video games
Video games developed in Japan
Video games featuring female protagonists